This article lists players who have captained the Galway minor hurling team in the All-Ireland Minor Hurling Championship.

List of captains

References

Hurlers
+Captains
Galway